Node 4, also known as the Docking Hub System (DHS), was  a proposed module of the International Space Station (ISS). In 2011 NASA was considering a 40-month design and development effort for Node 4 that would result in its launch in late 2013.

Node 4 would have been built using the Node Structural Test Article (STA) and docked to the forward port of the Harmony module. The Structural Test Article was built to facilitate testing of ISS hardware and was intended to become Node 1. However, during construction, structural design flaws  were discovered. The under-construction Node 2 was renamed Node 1 and the STA (ex-Node 1) was put into storage at the Kennedy Space Center (KSC).

Since the Space Shuttle program was retired, had a decision to build and launch Node 4 been taken, it would have been launched by an Atlas V or Delta IV rocket.

In December 2011 Boeing proposed using Node 4 as the core of an Exploration Gateway Platform to be constructed at the ISS and relocated via space tug to an Earth-Moon Lagrange point (EML-1 or 2). The purpose of the platform would be to support lunar landing missions with a reusable lunar lander after the first two SLS flights. It would also satisfy the need for a L1 propellant depot for lunar missions. Other hardware would include an airlock, an 'international module', and a MPLM based habitat module.

In June 2020 the Node STA was moved from the Space Station Processing Facility to the Shuttle Landing Facility to make room for commercial partners.

See also 
 ISS Propulsion Module

References

External links
 Hi-res spherical panorama inside the Node 4 module exterior shell located in the SSPF, Nov 10, 2010

Components of the International Space Station
Proposed spacecraft